Ronald Albert George Lee (15 September 1912 – 10 March 1990) was a British philatelist who was added to the Roll of Distinguished Philatelists in 1965.

In the 1939 National Register Lee is described as an Assistant Factory Manager living in Willesden.

References

Signatories to the Roll of Distinguished Philatelists
1912 births
1990 deaths
British philatelists
Presidents of the Royal Philatelic Society London